The Caiman is an MRAP with a V-hull design based on the Family of Medium Tactical Vehicles (FMTV) and Low Signature Armored Cab (LSAC), initially developed by Stewart & Stevenson and now produced by BAE Systems Platforms & Services.

Description

The Caiman completed testing by the U.S. military at the Aberdeen Proving Grounds in July 2007. On 13 July 2007, Armor Holdings received a prime contract award by the U.S. Navy on the behalf of the U.S. Marine Corps for $518.5 million under the MRAP vehicle program. The contract specified delivery of 1,154 Category I MRAP vehicles and 16 Category II MRAP vehicles by the end of February 2008.

BAE Systems acquired Armor Holdings in 2007 and continued production of the Caiman.

The Caiman is based on the chassis and automotives of the Medium Tactical Vehicle variant of the FMTV and features:
10-man crew capacity
Tensylon composite armor
Armor enhancement capable
Accepts all types of manned and remote weapons stations
85 percent parts commonality with standard FMTV models (40,000 of which are already fielded)
Full-time all wheel drive
Fully automatic transmission
Electronic Central Tire Inflation System (CTIS)
Anti-lock braking system (ABS)
Class V Interactive Electronic Technical Manuals (IETM)

In August 2009, the U.S. Army announced that Oshkosh Defense had been awarded the FMTV A1P2 rebuy production contract. This award did not include the Caiman.

In September 2010 BAE Systems has been awarded a $629 million contract from the U.S. MRAP Joint Program Office to upgrade 1,700 Caiman MRAP vehicles to Caiman Multi-Terrain Vehicle - Caiman MTV standard. The upgraded vehicle integrates a refurbished and improved armored capsule from an existing vehicle with a new high-power automotive power train, chassis and independent suspension made by ArvinMeritor. Greater survivability is achieved through an enhanced monolithic floor, a strengthened chassis frame and better blast absorbing seats.

On December 18, 2011, a Caiman was part of the last U.S. military convoy out of Iraq, being the last vehicle to cross the border into Kuwait, signifying the end of U.S. military presence and operations in the eight-year Iraq War.

Starting in October 2013, local police and sheriff offices in the U.S. began to acquire Caiman 6x6 MTVs. The U.S. government offered these vehicles to local law enforcement as the need for them greatly decreased after the Iraq and Afghanistan wars ended. The Caiman MTV normally costs $412,000, but is sold for only its transportation costs to the local jurisdiction.

In September 2014, the U.S. approved a $2.5 billion deal with the United Arab Emirates Army for over 4,500 surplus U.S. MRAPs for increased force protection, conducting humanitarian assistance operations, and protecting vital international commercial trade routes and critical infrastructure. 1,150 vehicles were Caimans.

Operators

Military operators
 : Egyptian Armed Forces — 400
 : Iraqi Special Operations Forces
 : Libyan National Army
 : Nigerian Army — part of a batch of 24 MRAPs
 : United Arab Emirates Army — 1,150
 : United States Armed Forces

Civilian operators
 : NASA and several law enforcement agencies

Non-state operators
  People's Defense Units (YPG)

See also
 Family of Medium Tactical Vehicles (FMTV)

References

BAE Systems land vehicles
Wheeled armoured fighting vehicles
Military vehicles introduced in the 2000s
Wheeled armoured personnel carriers
Six-wheeled vehicles